Abu Hafs Muhammad Ghiyas-ud-Din is a Pakistani politician who had been a Member of the Provincial Assembly of the Punjab from August 2018 till January 2023. Previously, he was a member of the Punjab Assembly between 1985 and May 2018.

Early life and education
He was born on 1 January 1948 in Narowal.

He graduated from University of the Punjab in 2006 and obtained a Bachelor of Arts.

In 1987, he has received Shahadatul Almia which is equivalent to Master of Arts in Islamiat from Tanzeem-ul-Madaris Ahl-e-Sunnat, Lahore.

Political career

He was elected to the Provincial Assembly of the Punjab from Constituency PP-155 (Sialkot) in 1985 Pakistani general election.

He ran for the seat of the National Assembly of Pakistan as a candidate of Pakistan Awami Tehrik (PAT) from Constituency NA-91 (Sialkot-VII) in 1988 Pakistani general election but was unsuccessful. He received 21,497 votes and defeated Anwar Aziz Chaudhry, a candidate of Islami Jamhoori Ittehad (IJI).

He ran for the seat of the Provincial Assembly of the Punjab as a candidate of the Pakistan Democratic Alliance (PDA) from Constituency PP-114 (Sialkot-XIII) in 1990 Pakistani general election, but was unsuccessful. He received 3,752 votes and lost the seat to Atiq-ur-Rehman, a candidate of IJI.

He ran for the seat of the Provincial Assembly of the Punjab as an independent candidate from Constituency PP-114 (Narowal-III) in 1993 Pakistani general election, but was unsuccessful. He received 9,437 votes and lost the seat to Muhammad Tariq Anees, a candidate of Pakistan Muslim League (N) (PML-N).

He was re-elected to the Provincial Assembly of the Punjab as an independent candidate from Constituency PP-114 (Narowal-III) in 1997 Pakistani general election. He received 14,609 votes and defeated Asghar Ali Chaudhry, a candidate of PML-N.

He ran for the seat of the Provincial Assembly of the Punjab as an independent candidate from Constituency PP-33 (Narowal-II) in 2002 Pakistani general election, but was unsuccessful. He received 13,227 votes and lost the seat to Tahir Ali Javed, a candidate of Pakistan Muslim League (Q) (PML-Q).

He ran for the seat of the Provincial Assembly of the Punjab as a candidate of Pakistan Peoples Party (PPP) from Constituency PP-33 (Narowal-II) in 2008 Pakistani general election, but was unsuccessful. He received 16,279 votes and lost the seat to Tahir Ali Javed, a candidate of PML-Q.

He was re-elected to the Provincial Assembly of the Punjab as a candidate of PML-N from Constituency PP-133 (Narowal-II) in 2013 Pakistani general election. He received 45,473 votes and defeated an independent candidate, Naimat Ali Javed.

He was re-elected to Provincial Assembly of the Punjab as a candidate of PML-N from Constituency PP-47 (Narowal-II) in 2018 Pakistani general election.

References

Living people
Punjab MPAs 2013–2018
1948 births
Pakistan Muslim League (N) MPAs (Punjab)
Punjab MPAs 1985–1988
Punjab MPAs 1997–1999
Punjab MPAs 2018–2023